The Battle of Basra was a battle fought in the beginning of the 1991 Iraqi uprisings following the Gulf War. The battle started after demoralized troops throughout Iraq began to rebel against Saddam Hussein's Ba'athist regime, in particular after a tank driver in Basra fired at a public portrait of Saddam Hussein. Basra became a chaotic battlefield between military defectors and Iraqi Republican Guard, with most of the fighting taking place at close quarters. Most of Basra had been retaken by mid March, but rebels in parts such as Tanuma managed to hold out until mid April. After Ba'athist forces had regained control, they engaged in a crackdown against civilians and suspected supporters of the uprising.

Uprising

1 March 
The turmoil began in Basra on 1 March 1991, one day after the Gulf War ceasefire, when a T-72 tank gunner returning home after Iraq's defeat in Kuwait fired a shell into an enormous portrait of Saddam Hussein hanging over the city's main square and the other soldiers applauded.

4 March 
By 4 March, the forces loyal to Saddam Hussein had managed to gain the upper hand in the battle, and began a brutal counter-offensive characterised by the arbitrary killing of civilians, with government tanks reportedly firing at buildings and civilians and Republican Guardsmen engaging in massacres against the civilian population. The fighting entered a stand-still by early April and the local resistance and the Republican Guardsmen entered a truce.

References

External links
 The 1991 Uprising in Iraq And Its Aftermath

Basra
Basra
Basra
Basra
History of Basra
Basra
Basra
Basra
Rebellions in Iraq
Iraqi war crimes
March 1991 events in Asia
April 1991 events in Asia